is a city located in Kagoshima Prefecture, Japan.

The modern city of Isa was created on November 1, 2008, from the merger of the old city of Ōkuchi, and the town of Hishikari (from Isa District). Isa District was dissolved as a result of this merger.

As of October 1, 2010, the city has an estimated population of 30,070, with 14,294 households and a population density of 76.64 persons per km². The total area is 392.36 km².

Geography

Climate 
Isa has a humid subtropical climate (Köppen climate classification Cfa) with hot summers and mild winters. Precipitation is significant throughout the year, and is heavier in summer, especially the months of June and July.

Demographics
Per Japanese census data, the population of Isa in 2020 is 24,453 people. Isa's population peaked in the 1950s and has been steadily declining since then until 2020.

References

External links
 Isa City official website 
 Isa City merger 

Cities in Kagoshima Prefecture